A deadjectival verb is a type of verb derived from an adjective.
In English, the verb may be created by adding a suffix to the adjective: intense (A)+ -ify (Verbalizer) → intensify or a prefix, e.g., en- + large → enlarge.

References

Parts of speech
Verb types